Belize is a country in Central America.

Belize may also refer to:
Belize District, a district of Belize
Belize City, Belize's largest city
Belize River, a river in Belize
Belize, Angola, a town in the Angolan province of Cabinda
Belize Inlet, British Columbia, Canada, named for Belize City
British Honduras, a former British colony called Belize after 1973

See also
La Balize, Louisiana, established by the French c. 1700